Florence Rabier (born 1971) is a French meteorologist who is Director-General of the European Centre for Medium-Range Weather Forecasts. She works on Numerical Weather Prediction. She was appointed a Knight of the Legion of Honour in 2014.

Early life and education 
Rabier joined Météo-France as an undergraduate engineer in meteorology from the École nationale de la météorologie. After completing her undergraduate she joined the Toulouse III - Paul Sabatier University, where she earned a master's degree in meteorology. She moved to the University of Paris (Pierre and Marie Curie University) for her doctoral studies, where she researched variations in meteorological data in the presence of barlocline instabilities. She became a senior scientist in 1998.

Research and career 
Rabier held various positions at Météo-France, where she worked on numerical weather prediction. In 1997, she developed data assimilation methods to optimise the use of satellite observations in weather forecasting. In particular, Rabier worked on four dimensional variation methods. She was appointed Head of the Observation Section of Météo-France in 2001.

In 2003, Rabier was made Chief Engineer of Bridges and Roads. She worked on the Infrared Atmospheric Sounding Interferometer (IASI), an instrument for European meteorological satellites. The IASI is an interferometer that permits the measurement of atmospheric and humidity profiles. IASI has been operating since 2007 and considerably improved operational meteorology. During the International Polar Year (2007-2008) Rabier was part of a field campaign over Antarctica.

Rabier moved to the European Centre for Medium-Range Weather Forecasts (ECMWF) in 2013, where she served as Director of Forecasts. In 2016 Rabier was appointed Director-General of ECMWF. She uses supercomputers (the Cray-1) to better analyse and forecast the weather.

Rabier worked alongside Anne Grete Staume on the ADM-Aeolus mission, which launched in 2018. She was appointed Chair of the European Space Agency Advisory Committee on Earth Observations in 2021.

Awards and honours 
 2014 Chevalier de la Légion d'honneur
 2014 Académie de l'air et de l'espace  Grand Prix de l'Academie

Selected publications

References 

1971 births
Living people
French women scientists
21st-century women scientists
French meteorologists
Pierre and Marie Curie University alumni
Paul Sabatier University alumni
Chevaliers of the Légion d'honneur
Women meteorologists
Météo-France staff